The Apostolic Tradition (or Egyptian Church Order) is an early Christian treatise which belongs to the genre of the ancient Church Orders.  It has been described to be of "incomparable importance as a source of information about church life and liturgy in the third century".

Rediscovered in the 19th century, it was given the name of "Egyptian Church Order". In the first half of the 20th century, this text was commonly identified with the lost Apostolic Tradition presumed to have been written by Hippolytus of Rome. Due to this attribution, and the apparent early date of the text, Apostolic Tradition played a crucial role in the liturgical reforms of many mainstream Christian bodies. The attribution of the text to Hippolytus has since become a subject of continued debate in recent scholarship.

If the Apostolic Tradition is the work of Hippolytus of Rome, it would be dated before 235 AD (when Hippolytus is believed to have suffered martyrdom) and its origin would be Rome; this date has been defended by scholars such as Brent and Stewart in recent debates over its authorship.  Against this view, some scholars (see Bradshaw) believe that the key liturgical sections incorporate material from separate sources, some Roman and some not, ranging from the middle second to the fourth century, being gathered and compiled from about 375-400 AD, probably in Egypt or even Syria. Other scholars have suggested that the Apostolic Tradition portrays a liturgy that was never celebrated.

Manuscripts and sources
The original Greek text of the Apostolic Tradition has survived only in fragments; but the full Greek text circulated widely in the Eastern churches from the 4th century onwards, and is consequently found in translation in three ancient collections of the Church Orders, the Alexandrine Sinodos, the Aksumite Collection and the Verona Palimpsest. The Alexandrine Sinodos was re-discovered in the 19th century: a Bohairic Coptic version was published in 1848 by Tattam, the earlier Sahidic Coptic version was published in 1883 by Paul de Lagarde, the Ethiopic and Arabic versions in 1904 by George William Horner. The text found in the Sahidic version was named by the publishers Egyptian Church Order and corresponds to what is now usually known as Apostolic Tradition.

The text was also found in the late 5th century Latin manuscript known as Verona Palimpsest, where it is the third item in the collection. This version was published in 1900 by Edmund Hauler, but only just over half of the Apostolic Tradition section was preserved.

A much earlier Ethiopic version translated directly from the Greek around the late 5th century, was discovered in Ethiopia in 1999 in a 13th-century, or earlier, manuscript, amongst the works in a compendium of synodical materials, known as the 'Aksumite Collection'. This version survives complete, albeit that it adds selected further material (taken from the Didache and Didascalia) before the concluding chapter 43.  The text transmitted in the Aksumite Collection lacks the Anaphora of the Apostolic Tradition from Chapter 4; as this material is substantially duplicated in the Ethiopic Anaphora of the Apostles, which is recorded within a compendium of liturgical prayers elsewhere in the Collection.   

Chapter 36 of the probable Greek original text was identified in 1975 as one item in a florilegium of patristic fragments.  In 1964, the Greek text of the prayer over the oils in Chapter 5 was recognised in an eleventh or twelfth century manuscript liturgy for the anointing of the sick, preserved in the monastery of St Catherine at Mount Sinai.   

The surviving Bohairic and Arabic versions are translations of the Sahidic, which was itself translated from a Greek manuscript around the 9th century. The later Ethiopic version is a translation of a different, and more complete, medieval Arabic version; although even before the discovery of the Aksumite Collection manuscript, it was apparent that the later Ethiopic text had been corrected in places with reference to an independent witness to the Greek. For sections witnessed in both texts, the Latin and Aksumite Ethiopic versions (which are both strictly literal) translate closely similar Greek undertexts of 4th century date; while the base text Greek for the Sahidic version is substantially revised and later.  The Aksumite Ethiopic and Latin versions differ, however, in their concluding sections.  In the Latin version a concluding chapter, and part of a previous chapter on occasions for private prayer are then found repeated in a modified and expanded form in a second ending of the text; and a similar duplication is also, partly, witnessed in the Sahidic version. For the Greek text underlying the Aksumite Ethiopic version there is only one ending, which corresponds to the second conclusion of the Latin, without any preceding duplication.  Otherwise however, the Greek text underlying the Aksumite Ethiopic appears to have been marginally better than the text underlying the Latin version; but, of course, the much later date of the one surviving manuscript witness to the Aksumite Ethiopic implies a higher risk of accumulated copying errors of transmission.

Derived works 

The Apostolic Tradition is amongst the earliest Church Orders to achieve widespread acceptance and circulation; and consequently many subsequent Church Orders, especially in the East, are expansions or adaptations of it.  Hence, where the text in the versions may be unclear, missing or widely variant, it is sometimes possible to discern the most likely reading of the original Greek from consideration of counterpart passages one or more of these works.  The main derived works are:

 'The Canons of Hippolytus'. An extensive reworking and adaptation of the Apostolic Tradition made in Egypt in the 4th century.  It now survives only in an Arabic version, which translates a Sahidic translation of a Greek original.
 'Testament of the Lord'. Probably originating in Syria in the 4th or 5th century and extant in Syriac; this is an original composition, but one which makes extensive use of the Apostolic Tradition in parts.
 'The Eighth Book of the Apostolic Constitutions' The Apostolic Constitutions is a compendium of reworked Church Order materials, in which the Eighth Book depends on the Apostolic Tradition.  The Eighth Book is also transmitted in an epitome, or summary, of 5th century date; which has considerable independent value as a source, as the epitomator returned to the Greek text of the Apostolic Tradition itself for some of the liturgical prayers.  Consequently, there are several chapters of the Apostolic Tradition for which this epitome provides a Greek text; albeit one that is later and more heavily modified than is the source Greek text for the Latin and Aksumite Ethiopic versions.

Editions and publications 

Producing a critical edition of a work that survives in several versions, of which none are in the original language, is highly problematic.  Clearly the edition has to be a translation; but which language should be used as the common version?  And should the editor try to recover something close to the 'original' text; or rather to produce the best text for one or another of the surviving versions?

The first comprehensive critical editions were those of Gregory Dix in 1937, and then in 1946 by B. Botte.  Dix and Botte both attempted to recover an 'original' text of the 3rd century; but translated into English and French respectively.  Since then, G. Cuming prepared a student edition in English in 1976; taking the rather different approach of seeking to translate one of the versions; while Paul Bradshaw et al. have prepared a commentary in 2002 in which all versions are translated in synoptic columns, with no attempt to establish a primary text.  Indeed, Bradshaw maintains that, as 'living literature' the Apostolic Tradition cannot be regarded as ever having had a single primary text.

The more conservative approach of Dix and Botte has more recently been represented in the translation by Alistair Stewart.  For the first edition in 2001, Stewart selected eclectically for each chapter, the version that looked to have the best text; and then translated that, with correction from the others.  This approach has been criticised as implying a 'standard' text, when there was then no evidence that such a normative text had ever existed.  The discovery of the Aksumite Ethiopic version - especially in respect of its close relationship with the Latin version in those sections where both are witnessed - is claimed by Stewart as demonstrating (at least for the 4th century) that at one time a 'standard' complete text did indeed circulate, however much this may have been adjusted and reordered in later versions and derived works.  Stewart's second edition of 2015 mainly takes the Latin version as its base text; and translates the Aksumite Ethiopic for the most part for those chapters not witnessed in the Latin.

Date and place of composition 

The context for the Church Order represented in the Apostolic Tradition is one where Christians face official persecution, are regularly imprisoned for their faith and occasionally face martyrdom. All Christian worship takes place within private houses. Prospective new converts are assumed to be all adults, and are to be questioned initially by a 'teacher' in private before being introduced to the Christian congregation (certain categories of trades and professions being prohibited admission); but baptism is also extended to children and infants in newcoming families. Regular worship includes not only a weekly eucharist, but also a shared fellowship meal, or agape feast. Ecstatic prophecy is occasionally encountered in worship. All of these observations confirm a date in the 3rd century or earlier.

The wide range of forbidden trades specified (as for example, charioteers), confirm a place of composition in one of the two major urban centres of the Roman Empire, Rome itself, or Alexandria.  Particular provisions in the Church Order relate to local practices which identify this place as Rome; specifically that the dead are buried in catacombs sealed into shelves with tiles; and also the stipulation that, in the regular Sunday eucharist, portions of the bread consecrated by the bishop are to be broken off by deacons and carried by them to presbyters in other churches in the city, wrapped in napkins.

Recent scholarship, such as that by Bradshaw and Johnson, has called into question the degree to which the liturgical texts witnessed in the Apostolic Tradition may be taken as representing the regular forms of worship in Rome in the 3rd century.  They propose that, over the centuries, later and non-Roman liturgical forms have accumulated within an older, and substantially Roman, Church Order.

Title 

None of the manuscript versions carry a title, and so there is no direct evidence as to how the 'Apostolic Tradition' was originally known.  The quotation of chapter 36 in the Ochrid fragment is labelled, Diataxis (Ordinances) of the Holy Apostles: Given through Hippolytus; and this has been plausibly suggested as the probable title under which the whole text of the Apostolic Tradition circulated in Syria. The Epitome of the eighth book of the Apostolic Constitutions refers to Regulations of the Holy Apostles concerning ordination through Hippolytus, which could be an expansion on the same title.

The commonly used title; 'Apostolic Tradition' depends on identifying this work with an item on a list inscribed on a statue - once thought to be of Hippolytus - now in the Vatican Library.  Aside from the statue certainly not depicting Hippolytus (as it was originally female), there is no clear evidence for the inscribed list as being proposed to comprise Hippolytus's works.  Alistair Stewart points out that 'Apostolic Tradition' denotes a genre rather than a particular work; as all Church Orders aspire to convey Apostolic Tradition.  He also points out that the title on the statue ought properly to be read over two lines; which could then be rendered as On Spiritual Gifts; the Apostolic Tradition.  This could indeed well be the title of this work, as the first sentence of the current first chapter states "Those things then, concerning spiritual gifts which are worthy of note, we have set forth."  On the face of it, this would imply an earlier, lost, section, setting out how God creates spiritual gifts within individual believers, as a prelude to the surviving initial discussion of rites of appointment and ordination.

Attribution to Hippolytus

The section of the Alexandrine Sinodos, rediscovered in the 19th century, which was given the name of Egyptian Church Order, was identified with the lost Apostolic Tradition attributed to Hippolytus of Rome by Edward von der Goltz in 1906, and later by Eduard Schwartz in 1910 and by R.H. Connolly in 1916. This attribution was unanimously accepted by the scholars of that period, and became well-recognized through the works of Gregory Dix, in particular his famous The Shape of the Liturgy (1943, 1945). In addition to the above, according to Paul Bradshaw, the attribution to Hippolytus was based on the following data:
 the name Hippolytus is present in later Ancient Church Orders clearly derived from the text of the Apostolic Tradition, the Canons of Hippolytus and The Constitutions through Hippolytus.
 the term "apostolic tradition" itself is found on both the first and last page of the text.
 in 1551 Pirro Ligorio found an ancient Roman marble statue of a seated figure near Campo Verano in Rome and moved it to the Vatican Library where it still is. On one surface of the chair was a calendar carved in Greek paschal cycle, which remembered the one attributed to Hippolytus, and on another surface the titles of numerous writings, some of them by Hippolytus, and one named "On the charismata—Apostolic Tradition". This brought the scholars to presume the existence of a writing named Apostolic Tradition by Hippolytus.

More recently, the attribution of the Apostolic Tradition to Hippolytus of Rome has come under substantial criticism. According to several scholars, the Apostolic Tradition is a work written by another priest named Hippolytus, but who probably lived in Alexandria, or it contains material of separate sources ranging from the middle second to the fourth century. The reasons given to support this understanding are the following:
the name “Hippolytus” is found in transmission of the Church Orders only about one century and half after his death;
the reference to Hippolytus and to a tradition coming from the Apostles in later Church Orders can be easily explained as a pseudepigraphic work typical of this genre;
the form of liturgy it describes are quite different from other information we have about the Christian liturgical uses in ancient Rome and are by far more in line with the forms of Church life in Alexandria or in Syria;
the statue found in 1551 was without head, and the present bearded head was added later by Ligorio himself. The statue was very probably carved as a copy of a famous statue of Themista of Lampsacus, a woman. The list of engraved titles includes many works which are not by Hippolytus, while it lacks most of the works surely ascribable to him. This sculpture was probably placed in the ancient library of the Pantheon personifying one of the sciences and the engraved list could be the catalog of volumes kept nearby, a common use in Ancient Rome;
the title engraved on the statue refers to charismata also, but the Apostolic Tradition does not deal with this topic;
the probable original title of this treatise, according to J. Magne, was discovered in 1975 on a Greek fragment and it is not the one engraved on the statue.

Content
The Apostolic Tradition, as the other Church Orders, has the aim to offer authoritative "apostolic" prescriptions on matters of moral conduct, liturgy and Church organization. It can be divided in a prologue (chapter 1) and three main sections. The chapter numbers and order are those of Botte.

The first section, chapters 2 to 14, deals with the rituals of the organization of the Church, and it follows a hierarchical order starting from the bishops up to the lower levels of the structure. The content can be so summarized:
 chapter 1: (Prologue)
 chapter 2: 'On bishops'
 chapters 3: 'Prayer for the ordination of a bishop';
 chapter 4: (the Eucharist at the consecration of the bishop. It is the well-known Anaphora of the Apostolic Tradition);
 chapter 5: 'On the offering of oil';
 chapter 5: (on the offering of cheese and olives);
 chapter 7: 'On presbyters';
 chapter 8: 'On deacons';
 chapter 9: 'On confessors';
 chapter 10: 'On widows';
 chapters 11: 'On the reader';
 chapter 12: 'On virgins';
 chapter 13: 'On subdeacons'
 chapter 14: 'On a Spiritual gift'.

The second section, chapters 15 to 21, is about the catechumenate and the baptism;
 chapter 15: 'On newcomers'; the first step in the catechumenate: the questions about marriage status and whether they are slave or free;
 chapter 16: 'On trades and professions'; the questions about occupation and moral conduct. Some works are not considered compatible with the Christian life: these works include a manager of prostitutes, the sculptor or painter of idols, actors in the theater, teacher of "worldly knowledge" children (unless needed as the primary occupation), and a charioteer or gladiator in the gladiator competitions. Restrictions on military action are enumerated.
 chapter 17: 'On the time during which they will hear the word after crafts and professions'; the length of the preliminary instruction, about three years;
 chapter 18: 'On the prayer of the catechumens';
 chapter 19: 'On laying hands on the catechumens';the ritual at the end of the preliminary instruction;
 chapter 20: 'Of those who will receive baptism'; the final examination and the preparation in the days before the baptism;
 chapter 21: 'On the bestowal of holy baptism'; the detailed description of the baptismal liturgy.

The last section, chapters 22 to 43, is a compilation of rules about the community, listed without a clear order:
 chapter 22: (about the distribution of the Communion);
 chapter 23: 'On fasting';
 chapter 24: 'On gifts to the sick'; 'That those who receive should serve with haste'; about the distribution of the Communion to sick persons;
 chapter 25: 'On the bringing in of lights at the supper of the congregation';
 chapter 26: 'On the occasion of eating'; description of a liturgical dinner;
 chapter 27: 'That catechumens should not eat with the faithful'
 chapter 28: 'That one should eat with understanding and moderation'
 chapter 29: 'That one should eat with thanksgiving'
 chapter 30: 'On supper for widows';
 chapter 31: 'On the fruits which it is right to offer';
 chapter 32: 'On the blessing of fruits'; (about the offering to the bishop of the first-fruits);
 chapter 33: 'That nobody should touch any food at the Pascha before the proper time;
 chapter 34: 'That it is proper for deacons to attend on the bishop';
 chapter 35: 'On the time when it is proper to pray';
 chapter 36: 'That it is proper to partake of the Eucharist first, before anything else is consumed';
 chapter 37: 'That it is proper to guard the Eucharist carefully';
 chapter 38: 'That it is improper that anything should be allowed to fall from the cup:
 chapter 39: (everyday meetings of presbyters and deacons);
 chapter 40: 'On the cemeteries;
 chapter 41: 'On the time when it is proper to pray';
 chapter 42: (about the Sign of the Cross);
 chapter 43: (conclusion).

Influence
The text of the Apostolic Tradition was part of three main ancient collections of the Church Orders, the Alexandrine Sinodos, the Aksumite Collection and the Verona Palimpsest. Being included in the Alexandrine Sinodos, it was held to be authoritative in Asia Minor, Syria, Egypt and Ethiopia, where it was copied and re-edited.

The Apostolic Tradition was also used as basis for great part of the eighth book of the Apostolic Constitutions, which had a great diffusion in antiquity. Also the ancient Canons of Hippolytus, Testamentum Domini and Epitome of the eighth Book of the Apostolic Constitutions derive from it.

The text of the Apostolic Tradition, believed to be authentically a work describing the early 3rd century Roman liturgy, has been widely influential on liturgical scholarship in the twentieth century and it was one of the pillars of the liturgical movement. The anaphora included in chapter four was extensively used in preparing reforms for the Book of Common Prayer and the United Methodist Liturgies found in the current United Methodist Hymnal. This anaphora is also the inspiration for the Eucharistic Prayer n. II of the Catholic Mass of Paul VI.

The Roman Catholic prayer of ordination of bishops, renewed after the Second Vatican Council, has been re-written and based on the one included in the Apostolic Tradition.

Notes

External links 

 
Che cos'è la Traditio Apostolica of Andrea Nicolotti, from «Rivista di Storia del Cristianesimo» II/1 (2005), pp. 219–237.

4th-century Christian texts
Ancient church orders
Christianity in Rome
Texts in Koine Greek
Italian manuscripts